Cratoxylum maingayi is a plant in the family Hypericaceae. It is named for the botanist Alexander Carroll Maingay.

Description
The brown bark is smooth to fissured. The flowers are pale pink. The trees are cut for derum timber for limited local use.

Distribution and habitat
Cratoxylum maingayi grows naturally in Indochina, Sumatra, Peninsular Malaysia and Borneo. Its habitat is lowland forests.

References

maingayi
Flora of Indo-China
Flora of Peninsular Malaysia
Flora of Sumatra
Flora of Borneo
Taxonomy articles created by Polbot